Manuel Jose Garcia Ferreyra (Buenos Aires 1784 - 1848) was an Argentine politician, lawyer, economist and diplomat.

Argentine diplomats
Ambassadors of Argentina to Brazil
Argentine politicians
1784 births
1848 deaths
Burials at La Recoleta Cemetery